Feyli Lurs (Persian: لرهای فیلی) are a group of Lurs, an Iranian people living in western Iran and in eastern Iraq, and the language they speak is called Feyli-Luri.

The Feyli-Lurs are Shia Muslims and today their principal town is Khorram Abad in Lorestan Province, Iran.

History from the 17th century onwards 
During the 200 years in which the whole of Lorestan in present-day Iran and Iraq was ruled by hereditary vassals (vali), all the tribes in the region were called feylī. The first vassal Hosein Khan Solvizi was appointed by the Safavid king Shah Abbas the Great. But at the beginning of the 19th century, the situation changed when Mohammad Ali Mirza, eldest son of the Qajar king Fath-Ali Shah and governor-general of Kermanshah, took Pish-e Kuh (the eastern part of Lorestan) and left Posht-e Kuh (the western part) for the vassal. Since the name feylī was previously associated with Solvizi and the whole of Lorestan, it henceforth came to denote only those certain Luri tribes in Iran.

References 

Iranian peoples
Iranian ethnic groups
Kermanshah Province
Lorestan Province
Ilam Province
Lur people
Ethnic groups in the Middle East
Shia communities